McReynolds is a surname that refers to:
Allen McReynolds (1877-1960), American politician, Missouri senator
Andrew T. McReynolds (1808-1998), American military officer and lawyer
Brandon McReynolds (born 1991), American stock car racing driver
Brian McReynolds (born 1965), American ice hockey player 
Cliff McReynolds, American artist
David McReynolds (1929-2018), American Socialist
Faris McReynolds (born 1977), American artist and musician
James Clark McReynolds (1862–1946), American judge, attorney general, and Supreme Court justice
Jesse McReynolds (born 1929), American bluegrass musician
Jonathan McReynolds (born 1989), American gospel musician
Kevin McReynolds (born. 1959), American professional baseball player
Larry McReynolds (born 1959), American race car crew chief
Madison McReynolds (born 1993), American actress
Peter McReynolds, Northern Irish politician
Sam D. McReynolds (1872–1939), American politician from Tennessee
Thales McReynolds (1943-1988), American baseball player